Indigo Lake is a small, roughly triangular lake in Summit County, Ohio, in the United States. It is not a natural lake, having been created by the park service in Cuyahoga Valley National Park. It is a popular fishing location, with several species present including the Largemouth bass.

National Park

Originally the site of Gray's Quarry, a gravel and sand pit, Indigo Lake came under the responsibilities of the National Park Service on December 27, 1974, with the creation of the Cuyahoga Valley National Recreation Area. The pit was later filled with water by park service personnel to create what was subsequently called "Indigo Lake", which remains in place sustained by a constant supply of water from several natural springs in the immediate area. It is situated entirely within the boundaries of Cuyahoga Valley National Park.

It is one of only two places in the park closed to swimming. Although protected as part of the national park, the lake is a popular spot for local fishing. In addition, the lake, which normally freezes over in the colder months of the year, is used by the Akron Fire Department to practice under-ice rescue techniques each winter.

References

Reservoirs in Ohio
Bodies of water of Summit County, Ohio
Cuyahoga Valley National Park